Yablonovka is the name of several rural localities in Russia:
Yablonovka, Chuvash Republic, a village in Chukalskoye Rural Settlement of Shemurshinsky District of the Chuvash Republic
Yablonovka, Gvardeysky District, Kaliningrad Oblast, a settlement in Slavinsky Rural Okrug of Gvardeysky District of Kaliningrad Oblast
Yablonovka, Ozyorsky District, Kaliningrad Oblast, a settlement in Gavrilovsky Rural Okrug of Ozyorsky District of Kaliningrad Oblast
Yablonovka, Kaluga Oblast, a village in Maloyaroslavetsky District of Kaluga Oblast
Yablonovka, Leningrad Oblast, a logging depot settlement in Gromovskoye Settlement Municipal Formation of Priozersky District of Leningrad Oblast
Yablonovka, Novgorod Oblast, a rural locality classified as a railway station under the administrative jurisdiction of Uglovskoye Settlement in Okulovsky District of Novgorod Oblast
Yablonovka, Omsk Oblast, a village in Krasnoyarsky Rural Okrug of Sherbakulsky District of Omsk Oblast
Yablonovka, Primorsky Krai, a selo in Yakovlevsky District of Primorsky Krai
Yablonovka, Saratov Oblast, a selo in Rovensky District of Saratov Oblast